Renton railway station is a railway station serving the village of Renton, Scotland. The station is managed by ScotRail, and is served by their trains on the North Clyde Line.

History
Through running to Glasgow didn't commence until 1858, when the Glasgow, Dumbarton and Helensburgh Railway was opened; prior to this travellers had to transfer to steamships at Bowling to continue their journey southwards. The line through the station used to be double, but was reduced to single track around 1986.

The station buildings have now been taken over by Strathleven Artizans to become part of one of many taking part in ScotRail's Adopt a Station. The official opening was on 27 March 2010. A heritage centre has been created in a tribute to Robert the Bruce.

Facilities 

The station only has very basic facilities, being a help point, a bench and some bike racks. The ticket office is no longer in use, so - given there are no facilities to purchase tickets - passengers must buy one in advance, or from the guard on the train. The station has step-free access.

Passenger volume 

The statistics cover twelve month periods that start in April.

Services 

References

External links 

Railway stations in West Dunbartonshire
Former Dumbarton and Balloch Railway stations
Railway stations in Great Britain opened in 1850
SPT railway stations
Railway stations served by ScotRail
Vale of Leven